Yaquina, at one time a thriving port called Yaquina City, is an unincorporated community in Lincoln County, in the U.S. state of Oregon.  It is near the mouth of the Yaquina River, on the east side of Yaquina Bay, and is a  drive from Newport. The Oregon Press Association, which became the Oregon Newspaper Publishers Association, was founded in Yaquina City in 1887.

Name
The city, the bay, and the river are all named for the Yaquina people, a small Native American tribe of Yakonan speakers who lived near the bay.

History

In the late 19th century, Yaquina City was the western terminus of the Oregon Pacific Railroad, linking the harbor there to Corvallis and Albany. Thomas Egenton Hogg, the rail line's chief promoter, and his Eastern financial backers believed that a steamship–railroad combination using Yaquina Bay could compete successfully with the usual Columbia River route to Portland. The first train moved over the line in 1885, making connections at Yaquina City with a steamer to San Francisco. However, the Yaquina–Albany line and a partly completed extension from Albany toward the Cascade Range, became too expensive to continue. After the Oregon Pacific failed financially, it fell into receivership and went through 17 years of financial and legal complications before becoming a branch line of the Southern Pacific in 1907.

In 1911, the city had a railroad station, a roundhouse and associated railroad shops, a bank, a three-story hotel, other commercial establishments, and many homes. As many as eight trains were needed on weekends to carry beach-goers from the Willamette Valley to Yaquina City and the steamer Yaquina, which carried them across the bay to Newport. However, Newport and nearby Toledo, more accessible by highway, grew larger over time while Yaquina City shrank. By the beginning World War II, Toledo was the western terminus of the rail line, and the tracks from there to Yaquina City were removed. Roughly 20 years later, the former seaport's population dropped to zero. Historian Edwin Culp writes: "Today one can drive along the bay from Newport to Toledo, pass through Yaquina City, and never know that such a town existed."

On August 21, 2017, Yaquina became the first place in the United States to witness totality of the solar eclipse.

References

Unincorporated communities in Lincoln County, Oregon
Unincorporated communities in Oregon
Oregon placenames of Native American origin